Archbold may refer to:

People
 Barry Archbold (born 1933), Australian rules footballer
 Darin Archbold (born 1969), American basketball player
 Jo Archbold, model
 John Archbold (disambiguation), several people
 Michael G. Archbold, American businessman
 Ralph Archbold (1942–2017), historical impersonator of Benjamin Franklin
 Richard Archbold (1907–1976), American zoologist, grandson of John Dustin Archbold
 Shane Archbold (born 1989), New Zealand professional racing cyclist
 Thomas Archbold (died after 1488), Irish Crown official, lawyer and judge

Places
 Archbold, Ohio, village in Fulton County, Ohio, United States
 Archbold High School, public high school in Archbold, Ohio, United States
 Archbold Biological Station, Lake Placid, FL, USA, founded by Richard Archbold
 Archbold Gymnasium, gymnasium located on the campus of Syracuse University, New York, United States, named after John Dustin Archbold
 Archbold Stadium, former multi-purpose stadium in Syracuse, New York, United States, named after John Dustin Archbold

Other
 Archbold's bowerbird (Archboldia papuensis), bowerbird named after Richard Archbold
 Archbold Criminal Pleading, Evidence and Practice, leading practitioners' text for criminal lawyers in various common law jurisdictions around the world

See also

 
 Archibald (disambiguation)